Kim Chel-Hwan (born 11 May 1971) is a South Korean former field hockey player who competed in the 2000 Summer Olympics.

References

External links

1971 births
Living people
South Korean male field hockey players
Olympic field hockey players of South Korea
Field hockey players at the 2000 Summer Olympics
Olympic silver medalists for South Korea
Olympic medalists in field hockey
Medalists at the 2000 Summer Olympics